Ophiorrhiza is a genus of flowering plants in the coffee family (Rubiaceae). Species of the genus contain camptothecin, an alkaloid used to make chemotherapeutic agents.
So many of Ophiorrhiza species are endemic to certain areas of western Ghats.
Species include:
Ophiorrhiza acuminata
Ophiorrhiza blumeana
Ophiorrhiza bracteata
Ophiorrhiza cantoniensis
Ophiorrhiza carinata
Ophiorrhiza caudata
Ophiorrhiza dulongensis
Ophiorrhiza filistipula
Ophiorrhiza japonica
Ophiorrhiza kuroiwai
Ophiorrhiza liukiuensis
Ophiorrhiza longiflora
Ophiorrhiza lurida
Ophiorrhiza major
Ophiorrhiza michelloides
Ophiorrhiza mungos
Ophiorrhiza nutans
Ophiorrhiza prostrata
Ophiorrhiza pumila
Ophiorrhiza rosea
Ophiorrhiza rugosa
Ophiorrhiza succirubra
Ophiorrhiza meenachilarensis

References

External links
Vascular Plants of Gaoligong Shan, Yunnan, China: Ophiorrhiza
Darwin, S. P. (1976). The Pacific species of Ophiorrhiza (Rubiaceae). Lyonia 1:2.

Rubiaceae genera
Ophiorrhizeae